Parviz Dehdari (March 21, 1935 – November 23, 1992) was an Iranian football player and coach.

Early life
He was born on 21 March 1935 in Marvdasht from an Abadani family. His family moved back to Abadan after his birth. He grew up in Abadan and began playing football in 1946.

Playing career
He initially to Jam Abadan in 1953. His good techniques in Jam and after winning the Local Cup in 1955, he was invited to Team Melli and made his debut in match against Soviet Union in November 1955. He played for Jam Abadan, Shahin Tehran and has served most of his career in Abadan. He was captain of Jam Abadan in 1960 and win the first championship in IRN championship cup.

Coaching career
He was in Shahin until the club's dissolution in 1966. Then he signed a contract with Persepolis F.C. and became head coach of club. He was the first manager of Persepolis and caused that Shahin F.C. players move to Persepolis. He became head coach of Homa F.C. in 1969 after leaves Persepolis. He won Takhte Jamshid Cup for two times with Homa. After his good results in Homa, he was appointed as Head coach of National football team in 1971. He coached team in Olympic Games in Munich, the team was able to successfully deliver the Olympic competition. But resigned before the tournament. He resigned because of differences he had with his assistant, Mohammad Ranjbar. He was re-appointed as head coach of national team in 1986. He led team melli in 1986 Asian Games and 1988 AFC Asian Cup. Team Melli became third place in 1988 Asian Cup and Dehdari was sacked by Islamic Republic of Iran Football Federation on 22 January 1989.

Personal life
He was married in 1957, he and his wife had two sons. In April 2002 his wife, Mahnaz, died of lung cancer.

Death
He died on November 23, 1992 as a result of kidney disease at his home. Each year a ceremony is held in Abadan in his honor. Today, he is called the Comportment schema. A street behind Takhti Stadium has been named after Parviz Dehdari.

References

External links
 

1933 births
1992 deaths
People from Abadan, Iran
Shahin FC players
Persepolis F.C. managers
Iranian football managers
1988 AFC Asian Cup managers
Footballers at the 1958 Asian Games
Association football midfielders
Iranian footballers
Iran international footballers
Asian Games competitors for Iran
Sportspeople from Khuzestan province